The 2021–22 Wisła Kraków season is the 82nd season in the Ekstraklasa and the 68th season in the Polish Cup.

Transfers

Summer transfer window

Arrivals 
 The following players moved to Wisła.

Departures
 The following players moved from Wisła.

Winter transfer window

Arrivals 
 The following players moved to Wisła.

Departures
 The following players moved from Wisła.

Competitions

Preseason and friendlies

Ekstraklasa

League table

Results summary

Results by round

Matches

Polish Cup

Squad and statistics

Appearances, goals and discipline

Goalscorers

Assists

Disciplinary record
{|class="wikitable sortable" style="text-align: center;"
|-
!rowspan=2 style="background:#DD0000; color:white"| 
!rowspan=2 style="background:#DD0000; color:white"| 
!rowspan=2 style="background:#DD0000; color:white"| 
!rowspan=2 style="background:#DD0000; color:white"| Name
!colspan=3 style="background:#DD0000; color:white"| Ekstraklasa
!colspan=3 style="background:#DD0000; color:white"| Polish Cup
!colspan=3 style="background:#DD0000; color:white"| Total
|rowspan=2 style="background:#DD0000; color:white"| Notes
|-
!width=30 |
!width=30 |
!width=30 |
!width=30 |
!width=30 |
!width=30 |
!width=30 |
!width=30 |
!width=30 |
|-

References

Wisła Kraków seasons
Wisla Krakow